The 1972 Wichita Shockers football team was an American football team that represented Wichita State University as a member of the Missouri Valley Conference (MVC) during the 1972 NCAA University Division football season. In its third season under head coach Bob Seaman, the team compiled a 6–5 record (2–4 against conference opponents), finished in sixth place out of eight teams in the MVC and was outscored by a total of 228 to 156.  The team played its home games at Cessna Stadium in Wichita, Kansas. 

The 1972 season was the Shockers' first with a winning record since 1963. In the seven prior seasons, the program had compiled an 11–57 record and sustained tragedy in the 1970 Wichita State University football team plane crash. 

The team's statistical leaders included Tom Owen with 689 passing yards, Don Gilley with 446 rushing yards, Eddie Plopa with 269 receiving yards, and Don Burford and Don Gilley with 24 points each.

Schedule

References

Wichita State
Wichita State Shockers football seasons
Wichita State Shockers football